The National Museum of the United States Air Force (formerly the United States Air Force Museum) is the official museum of the United States Air Force located at Wright-Patterson Air Force Base,  northeast of Dayton, Ohio. The NMUSAF is the oldest and largest military aviation museum in the world, with more than 360 aircraft and missiles on display. The museum draws about a million visitors each year, making it one of the most frequently visited tourist attractions in Ohio.

History
The museum dates to 1923, when the Engineering Division at Dayton's McCook Field first collected technical artifacts for preservation. In 1927, it moved to then-Wright Field in a laboratory building. In 1932, the collection was named the Army Aeronautical Museum and placed in a WPA building from 1935 until World War II. In 1948, the collection remained private as the Air Force Technical Museum. In 1954, the Air Force Museum became public and was housed in its first permanent facility, Building 89 of the former Patterson Field in Fairborn, which had been an engine overhaul hangar. Many of its aircraft were parked outside and exposed to the weather.

Through the 1960s, Eugene Kettering, son of Charles F. Kettering, led the project to build a permanent structure to house the collections and became the first chairman of the board of the Air Force Museum Foundation. When he died in 1969, his widow Virginia took over the project. Her "determination, logic and meticulous attention" kept it on track, and the current facility opened in 1971. Not including its annex on Wright Field proper, the museum has more than tripled in square footage since 1971, with the addition of a second hangar in 1988, a third in 2003, and a fourth in 2016.

The museum announced a new name for the facility in October 2004. The former name, United States Air Force Museum, changed to National Museum of the United States Air Force.

The museum is a central component of the National Aviation Heritage Area.

Exhibits and collections
The museum's collection contains many rare aircraft of historical or technological importance, and various memorabilia and artifacts from the history and development of aviation. Among them is the Apollo 15 Command Module Endeavour which orbited the Moon 74 times in 1971, one of four surviving Convair B-36 Peacemakers, the only surviving North American XB-70 Valkyrie and Bockscar—the Boeing B-29 Superfortress that dropped the Fat Man atomic bomb on Nagasaki during the last days of World War II.

In 2010, the museum launched its 360-degree Virtual Tour, allowing most aircraft and exhibits to be viewed online.

The addition was privately financed by the Air Force Museum Foundation at a cost of $40.8 million (equivalent to $ in ). The building houses more than 70 aircraft, missiles, and space vehicles in four new galleries - Presidential, Research and Development, Space and Global Reach, along with three science, technology, engineering and math (STEM) Learning Nodes.

In 2018, the Boeing B-17F Memphis Belle was placed on permanent public display in the World War II Gallery. The aircraft and its crew became iconic symbols of the heavy bomber crews and support personnel who helped defeat Nazi Germany.

Presidential aircraft
The museum has several Presidential aircraft, including those used by Franklin D. Roosevelt, Harry Truman and Dwight D. Eisenhower. The centerpiece of the presidential aircraft collection is SAM 26000, a modified Boeing 707 known as a VC-137C, used regularly by presidents John F. Kennedy, Lyndon B. Johnson and Richard Nixon. This aircraft took President and Mrs. Kennedy to Dallas on 22 November 1963—the day of the President's assassination. Vice President Johnson was sworn in as president aboard it shortly after the assassination, and the aircraft then carried Kennedy's body back to Washington. It became the backup presidential aircraft after Nixon's first term. It was temporarily removed from display on 5 December 2009, repainted and returned to display on President's Day in 2010.

All presidential aircraft are now displayed in the Presidential Gallery, in the new fourth building.

Pioneers of flight
A large section of the museum is dedicated to pioneers of flight, especially the Wright Brothers, who conducted some of their experiments at nearby Huffman Prairie. A replica of the Wrights' 1909 Military Flyer is on display, as well as other Wright brothers artifacts. The building also hosts the National Aviation Hall of Fame, which includes several educational exhibits.

Uniforms and clothing

 

The museum has many pieces of U.S. Army Air Forces and U.S. Air Force clothing and uniforms. At any time, more than 50 World War II-vintage A-2 leather flying jackets are on display, many of which belonged to famous figures in Air Force history. Others are painted to depict the airplanes and missions flown by their former owners. The displays include the jacket worn by Brigadier General James Stewart, P-38 ace Major Richard I. Bong's sheepskin B-3 jacket and boots, an A-2 jacket worn by one of the few USAAF pilots to leave the ground during the attack on Pearl Harbor, and President Ronald Reagan's USAAF peacoat.

Other exhibits and attractions
The museum completed the construction of a third hangar and hall of missiles in 2004. It now houses post-Cold War era planes such as the Northrop Grumman B-2 Spirit stealth bomber (test aircraft), the Lockheed F-117 Nighthawk stealth ground attack aircraft and others. A fourth hangar was completed in 2016, to house the museum's space collection, presidential planes, and an enlarged educational outreach area. Previously these collections were housed in an annex facility on Area B of Wright-Patterson Air Force Base (the former Wright Field). Because the annex was physically located on the base itself, museum guests were required to go through additional security checks before taking museum buses to the hangar.

The museum owns other USAF aircraft, including former U.S. Army Air Service, USAAC or USAAF aircraft, that are on loan to other aerospace museums in the United States and overseas, as well as those on permanent static display at various U.S. Air Force installations and tenant activities worldwide, and at Air Force Reserve and Air National Guard installations across the United States. Most of these loaned aircraft duplicate aircraft exhibited by the museum. These other aircraft remain the property of the Department of the Air Force and are typically identified at these locations as being "On Loan from the National Museum of the U.S. Air Force." The museum's staff has very high standards for the restoration and quality of care of loaned assets and has, in the past, revoked these loans when it was deemed that these other museums did not have the resources to properly care for an artifact. This happened in the case of the famous Boeing B-17 Flying Fortress, Memphis Belle.

For an additional fee, guests can view aviation- and space-oriented films in a large format theater interspersed primarily with other documentaries. In 2013, the Air Force Museum Theater was upgraded from IMAX to digital 3D. The renovation included a new stage, theater seats, and a new theater screen to support a broader range of programming—including educational presentations, live broadcasts and expanded documentary choices. It also included a 7.1 surround-sound system, audio devices for the hearing or visually impaired, and personal closed captioning systems.

The National Museum of the U.S. Air Force completed a multi-phase, long-term expansion plan. The Air Force Museum Foundation recently supported a major capital construction program that expanded the museum to the current 1 million square feet of exhibit space with the addition of the fourth building that now houses the Space Gallery, Presidential Aircraft Gallery and Global Reach Gallery. This new fourth building opened to the public on 8 June 2016. With the addition of new space, more than 70 aircraft that were in storage have been put back on display, such as the XB-70 Valkyrie. The Presidential Aircraft collection is also back on site, having been moved to an outside location for some time.

The new building's construction was entirely funded via private donations from several different sources.

Collection

The museum is divided into galleries that cover broad historic trends in military aviation. These are further broken down into exhibits that detail specific historical periods and display aircraft in historical context.

Air Force Museum Foundation
The Air Force Museum Foundation is a private, non-profit organization that supports the mission and goals of the National Museum of the U.S. Air Force.

Other Air Force museums

See also
American Air Museum in Britain
Mighty Eighth Air Force Museum
National Museum of the Marine Corps
National Museum of the United States Army
National Museum of the United States Navy
National Naval Aviation Museum (the U.S. Navy's equivalent facility to the NMUSAF)
United States Air Force Memorial
United States Army Aviation Museum
Related lists
List of aerospace museums

References

Notes

Bibliography

External links

 
 Air Force Museum Foundation official website
 SR-71 Online – National Museum of The United States Air Force – A guide to the museum and its displays.
 US Air Force Museum Photos – Photos of exhibits in the National Museum of the USAF in Dayton, OH
 Photo website with 360-degree VR panoramas and HDR images
 List of engines at the museum
 Air Force Materiel Command Mission Directive 417

Aerospace museums in Ohio
Wright-Patterson Air Force Base
Museums in Dayton, Ohio
Air force museums in the United States
Museums established in 1923
Military and war museums in Ohio
Tourist attractions in Montgomery County, Ohio
National Aviation Heritage Area
History of the United States Air Force
1923 establishments in Ohio
United States Air Force
Atomic tourism